Alida Olbers Wester (1842-1912) was a Swedish botanist noted for studying plant anatomy, particularly the structure of the pericarp.

Written works
Olbers, Alida. (1887). Om fruktväggens byggnad hos Borragineerna (in Swedish), P. A. Norstedt.

References

1842 births
1912 deaths
19th-century Swedish botanists
19th-century Swedish women scientists
20th-century Swedish botanists
Swedish women botanists
20th-century Swedish women scientists